Zsuzsanna Gahse ( Vajda; born 27 June 1946) is a Hungarian-born German-language writer and translator who lives in Switzerland.

Life and works
Gahse is the daughter of Hungarian parents and Hungarian is her mother tongue. Her family fled to the West after the Hungarian Revolution of 1956 and settled in Vienna, where Gahse attended high school and learnt the German language. She began publishing literary works in 1969, and from 1978, encouraged by her mentor Helmut Heißenbüttel, translating works from Hungarian. She has published German translations of works by István Eörsi, Péter Esterházy, Péter Nádas and Zsuzsa Rakovszky, as well as producing a range of essays and fiction under her own name. From 1989 to 1993 she was a lecturer at the University of Tübingen. In 1996, she lectured in poetry at the University of Bamberg.

Today she lives mainly in Müllheim, in the Swiss Canton of Thurgau.

Zsuzsanna Gahse is a member of the PEN Centers in Germany and Switzerland, as well as the authors' association Die Kogge.

In 2019, she has been awarded this year's Swiss Grand Prix Literature for her life's work.

Prizes and awards
 1983 Aspekte-Literaturpreis
 1990 Literaturpreis der Stadt Stuttgart
 1993 City of Zug Prize
 1999 Tibor-Déry-Preis
 2004 Bodensee-Literaturpreis
 2006 Adelbert von Chamisso Prize
 2009 Chamisso-Poetikdozentur
 2010 Johann-Heinrich-Voß-Preis für Übersetzung
 2010 Thurgauer Culture Prize
 2011 Made a member of the Deutsche Akademie für Sprache und Dichtung, Darmstadt
 2017 Italo-Svevo-Preis
2019 Swiss Grand Prix Literature

Works
 Zero. Munich, 1983
 Berganza. Munich, 1984
 Abendgesellschaft. Munich, 1986
 Liedrige Stücke. Warmbronn, 1987
 Stadt, Land, Fluß. Munich, 1988
 Einfach eben Edenkoben. Klagenfurt, 1990
 Hundertundein Stilleben. Klagenfurt, 1991
 Nachtarbeit. Warmbronn, 1991
 Essig und Öl. Hamburg, 1992
 Übersetzt. Berlin, 1993 (with Renate von Mangoldt)
 Laune. Stuttgart, 1993
 Passepartout. Klagenfurt, 1994
 Kellnerroman. Hamburg, 1996
 Wie geht es dem Text? Hamburg, 1997
 Calgary. Warmbronn, 1999
 Nichts ist wie oder Rosa kehrt nicht zurück. Hamburg, 1999
 Wörter, Wörter, Wörter! Göttingen, 1999 (with Stefana Sabin and Valentin Braitenberg)
 Kaktus haben. Alpnach Dorf, 2000 (with Christoph Rütimann)
 durch und durch. Vienna, 2004
 Instabile Texte. Vienna, 2005 (Volatile Texts: Us Two, translated by Chenxin Jiang, Dalkey Archive Books 2017)
 Oh, Roman. Vienna, 2007
 Erzählinseln. Reden für Dresden. Dresden, 2009
 Donauwürfel. Vienna, 2010
 Das Nichts in Venedig. Alpnach Dorf, 2010
 Südsudelbuch. Vienna, 2012
 Die Erbschaft. Vienna, 2013

References

1946 births
Living people
Hungarian emigrants to Switzerland
20th-century Swiss writers
20th-century Swiss women writers
21st-century Swiss writers
21st-century Hungarian women writers
20th-century translators
21st-century translators
Writers from Budapest
Academic staff of the University of Tübingen
Academic staff of the University of Bamberg